Wayunkayuq (Quechua wayunka a bunch of bananas, -yuq a suffix to indicate ownership, "the one with a bunch of bananas", also spelled Guayoncayoc) is a mountain in the Andes of Peru which reaches a height of approximately . It is located in the Ancash Region, Antonio Raymondi Province, Rontoy District.

References

Mountains of Peru
Mountains of Ancash Region